Sonata Vanagaitė (born 1 September 1994) is a Lithuanian football striker currently playing in the A Lyga for Gintra Universitetas, with which she has also played the Champions League. She is a member of the Lithuanian national team, for which she scored at 16 two goals in the Euro 2013 qualifying's preliminary round.

References

External links
 

1994 births
Living people
Lithuanian women's footballers
Place of birth missing (living people)
Women's association football forwards
Lithuania women's international footballers
Gintra Universitetas players